Takeshi Fuji (藤猛, born Paul Takeshi Fuji on July 6, 1940) is a Hawaiian-born Japanese former professional boxer. He is a former Lineal, WBA and WBC super lightweight (light welterweight) champion.

Biography 
Fuji was born a third generation Japanese-Hawaiian. He was raised in Hawaii, but traveled to Japan, where he joined the boxing gym run by former professional wrestler Rikidōzan. Though he fought in Japan for most of his career, he could not speak Japanese. His trainer, Eddie Townsend, was also a Japanese-American. He made his professional debut in April, 1964 with a 2nd-round KO.

In June, 1965, Fuji challenged the Japanese super lightweight title, and won by KO only 45 seconds into the first round. This was his 11th professional fight, and he defended the title once before returning it.

Fuji won the OPBF light welterweight title in 1966, and challenged Lineal, WBA and WBC light welterweight champion Sandro Lopopolo in April, 1967. Fuji won by KO in the second round to become the new world champion.

Fuji made his first defense in November, 1967, before returning his title. In December, 1968, he faced Nicolino Locche, defending his WBA light welterweight title, but gave up in the 10th round.

In June, 1970, Fuji was scheduled to face former world champion Eddie Perkins in a non-title match, but suddenly withdrew from the fight claiming to have an injury. The Japan Boxing Commission penalized Fuji with a suspension, and he retired shortly afterwards. His record was 34-3-1 (29KOs).

He used to work as a trainer at a boxing gym in Mito, Ibaraki. He once served as a member of the United States Marine corps. He is retired now and living in Hawaii.

See also 
 List of light welterweight boxing champions
 List of WBA world champions
 List of WBC world champions
 List of Japanese boxing world champions
 Boxing in Japan

References

External links 

Takeshi Fuji - CBZ Profile

1940 births
Boxers from Hawaii
American expatriates in Japan
Living people
Sportspeople from Honolulu
World Boxing Association champions
World Boxing Council champions
The Ring (magazine) champions
World light-welterweight boxing champions
World boxing champions
American sportspeople of Japanese descent
American male boxers